NV, nv, nV or Nv may refer to:

Places
 Nevada, a state in the United States of America
 North Vietnam
 North Vancouver (disambiguation)

Businesses and organizations
 Naamloze vennootschap (NV), a Dutch term for a public limited-liability company
 Iranian Naft Airlines, Iranian airline (IATA code)
 Air Central NV, Japanese airline (former IATA code)
 North Vista Secondary School, Singapore
 NV (Portland, Oregon), a residential tower in Oregon
 NV Homes, a real estate development company now part of NVR, Inc.
 Abbreviation used by Team EnVyUs, an international eSports organization based in the United States

Language
 Navajo language, ISO 639-1 code nv
 Radical 38 (女), "nü" in pinyin but often typed as "nv" as "v" is an alternate way to express "ü"

Music
 nv (album), 1995 album by Battery
 NV (album), a 2015 collaborative album by Dragged Into Sunlight and Gnaw Their Tongues

Science and technology
 Nv neuron, an artificial neuron
 Nv network, a term used in BEAM robotics
 Nitrogen-vacancy center, a color center in diamond
 nv, a unit of neutron flux equal to one thermal neutron per square centimeter per second
 Near vision, an acronym used in eyeglass prescriptions
 An abbreviation for NVIDIA, a graphics card company

Vehicles
 Nissan NV (disambiguation), the prefix of Nissan's commercial vans
 Nissan NV (North America), a 2011–2021 Japanese full-size van for the North American market
 Nissan NV Pickup, a 1993–1999 Japanese compact pickup truck for the Thai market
 Niutron NV, a 2022–present Chinese electric mid-size SUV